The 2019 WTA Tour was the elite professional tennis circuit organised by the Women's Tennis Association (WTA) for the 2019 tennis season. The 2019 WTA Tour calendar was composed of the Grand Slam tournaments (supervised by the International Tennis Federation (ITF), the WTA Premier tournaments (Premier Mandatory, Premier 5, and regular Premier), the WTA International tournaments, the Fed Cup (organized by the ITF), and the year-end championships (the WTA Tour Championships and the WTA Elite Trophy). The Hopman Cup, organized by the ITF, also is included but did not distribute ranking points.

Prior to the season, the WTA announced usage of a shot clock at all Premier events. Players had have a minute to get on court, five minutes to warm up, and one minute to start the match. The time allotted to players in between points has been increased from 20 to 25 seconds. Finally, players were allowed only one toilet break in a match.

Schedule
This is the complete schedule of events on the 2019 calendar, with player progression documented from the quarterfinals stage.
Key

January

February

March

April

May

June

July

August

September

October

November

Cancelled

Statistical information
These tables present the number of singles (S), doubles (D), and mixed doubles (X) titles won by each player and each nation during the season, within all the tournament categories of the 2019 WTA Tour: the Grand Slam tournaments, the year-end championships (the WTA Tour Championships and the WTA Elite Trophy), the WTA Premier tournaments (Premier Mandatory, Premier 5, and regular Premier), and the WTA International tournaments. The players/nations are sorted by:

 total number of titles (a doubles title won by two players representing the same nation counts as only one win for the nation);
 cumulated importance of those titles (one Grand Slam win equalling two Premier Mandatory/Premier 5 wins, one year-end championships win equalling one-and-a-half Premier Mandatory/Premier 5 win, one Premier Mandatory/Premier 5 win equalling two Premier wins, one Premier win equalling two International wins);
 a singles > doubles > mixed doubles hierarchy;
 alphabetical order (by family names for players).

Key

Titles won by player

Titles won by nation

Titles information
The following players won their first main circuit title in singles, doubles, or mixed doubles:
Singles
 Sofia Kenin – Hobart (draw)
 Wang Yafan – Acapulco (draw)
 Bianca Andreescu – Indian Wells (draw)
 Amanda Anisimova – Bogotá (draw)
 Petra Martić – İstanbul (draw)
 Jil Teichmann – Prague (draw)
 Maria Sakkari – Rabat (draw)
 Yulia Putintseva – Nuremberg (draw)
 Fiona Ferro – Lausanne (draw)
 Elena Rybakina – Bucharest (draw)
 Jessica Pegula – Washington, D.C. (draw)
 Zheng Saisai – San Jose (draw)
 Magda Linette – The Bronx (draw)
 Rebecca Peterson – Nanchang (draw)
 Karolína Muchová – Seoul (draw)
 Coco Gauff – Linz (draw)
Doubles
 Eugenie Bouchard – Auckland (draw)
 Sofia Kenin – Auckland (draw)
 Ekaterina Alexandrova – Budapest (draw)
 Aryna Sabalenka – Indian Wells (draw)
 Zoe Hives – Bogotá (draw)
 Astra Sharma – Bogotá (draw)
 Anna-Lena Friedsam – Stuttgart (draw)
 Anna Kalinskaya – Prague (draw)
 Viktória Kužmová – Prague (draw)
 Ellen Perez – Strasbourg (draw)
 Giuliana Olmos – Nottingham (draw)
 Yana Sizikova – Lausanne (draw)
 Cornelia Lister – Palermo (draw)
 Nina Stojanović – Jūrmala (draw)
 Coco Gauff – Washington (draw)
 Caty McNally – Washington (draw)
 Wang Xinyu – Nanchang (draw)
 Zhu Lin – Nanchang (draw)
 Veronika Kudermetova – Wuhan (draw)
 Hayley Carter – Tashkent (draw)
 Luisa Stefani – Tashkent (draw)
 Ena Shibahara – Tianjin (draw)

Mixed doubles
 Barbora Krejčíková – Australian Open (draw)

The following players defended a main circuit title in singles, doubles, or mixed doubles:
Singles
 Julia Görges – Auckland (draw)
 Alison Van Uytvanck – Budapest (draw)
 Garbiñe Muguruza – Monterrey (draw)
 Aryna Sabalenka – Wuhan (draw)
Doubles
 Ashleigh Barty – Rome (draw)
 Květa Peschke – San Jose (draw)
 Lucie Hradecká – Cincinnati (draw)
 Lyudmyla Kichenok – WTA Elite Trophy (draw)
 Tímea Babos – WTA Finals (draw)
 Kristina Mladenovic – WTA Finals (draw)
Mixed doubles
 Latisha Chan – French Open (draw)
 Bethanie Mattek-Sands – US Open (draw)

Best ranking
The following players achieved their career high ranking in this season inside top 50 (in bold the players who entered the top 10 for the first time):
Singles

Doubles

WTA rankings
These are the WTA rankings and yearly WTA Race rankings of the top 20 singles and doubles players at the current date of the 2019 season.

Singles

Number 1 ranking

Doubles

Number 1 ranking

Points distribution

S = singles players, D = doubles teams, Q = qualification players.
* Assumes undefeated Round Robin match record.

WTA fan polls

Player of the month

Breakthrough of the month

Shot of the month

Retirements
Following is a list of notable players (winners of a main tour title, and/or part of the WTA rankings top 100 [singles] or top 100 [doubles] for at least one week) who announced their retirement from professional tennis, became inactive (after not playing for more than 52 weeks), or were permanently banned from playing, during the 2019 season:
 Raquel Atawo (born 8 December 1982 in Fresno, California, United States) 
 Julia Boserup (born 9 September 1991 in Santa Monica, United States) joined the professional tour in 2010 and reached a career-high ranking of no. 80 in singles and 277 in doubles. Boserup played the majority of her career on the ITF Women's Circuit, where she won 3 singles titles and 1 doubles title. Her greatest achievement at Grand Slam level came at Wimbledon in 2016 where she reached the third round as a qualifier. After having not played in over a year, Boserup decided to retire in May 2019, citing ongoing injury problems.
 Dominika Cibulková (born 6 May 1989 in Bratislava, Czechoslovakia (present-day Slovakia)) joined the professional tour in 2004 and reached a career-high ranking of no. 4 in singles and no. 59 in doubles. She won eight WTA singles titles, including her victory at the 2016 WTA Finals. She reached six Grand Slam quarterfinals, including the final at the 2014 Australian Open, which she lost to Li Na. Cibulková announced her retirement on 12 November 2019, citing injury problems.
 Mariana Duque Mariño (born 12 August 1989 in Bogotá, Colombia) joined the professional tour in 2005 and reached a career-high ranking of no. 66 in singles and no. 96 in doubles. She won one WTA singles title at her home tournament in Bogotá in 2010, as well as 1 WTA doubles title and 19 singles titles on the ITF Women's Circuit.
 Julia Glushko (born 1 January 1990 in Donetsk, Ukraine)
 Anna-Lena Grönefeld (born 4 June 1985 in Nordhorn, West Germany) joined the professional tour in 2003 and reached a career-high ranking of number 14 in singles and number 7 in doubles (both in 2006). She has won 1 WTA singles title and 17 WTA doubles titles including 2 Grand Slam titles at the 2014 French Open Mixed doubles and 2009 Wimbledon Mixed doubles events. Additionally she won one doubles title at the WTA 125K level, 6 ITF doubles titles and 11 ITF singles titles. She announced her retirement from the tour in December 2019 citing that she wishes to start a family.
 María Irigoyen (born 24 June 1987 in Tandil, Argentina) joined the professional tour in 2005 and reached a career-high ranking of no. 147 in singles and no. 47 in doubles. Irigoyen was primarily a doubles specialist, winning two titles at the Rio Open in 2014 and 2016, as well as two golds and one bronze medal representing Argentina in the Pan American Games. 
 Emma Laine (born 26 March 1986 in Karlstad, Sweden) joined the professional tour in 2004 and reached a career-high ranking of no. 50 in singles and no. 64 in doubles. She won 11 singles titles and 44 doubles titles on the ITF Women's Circuit. Laine announced her last tournament would be the 2019 Fed Cup.
 An-Sophie Mestach (born 7 March 1994 in Ghent, Belgium) joined the professional tour in 2009 and reached a career-high ranking of no. 98 in singles and no. 64 in doubles. She won two doubles titles on the WTA Tour, as well as six singles titles on the ITF Women's Circuit. Mestach was also the junior no. 1 in 2011 and she was the winner of the 2011 Australian Open girls' singles event. Mestach announced her retirement in January 2019 to pursue a career as a policewoman.
 Arantxa Parra Santonja (born 9 November 1982 in Valencia, Spain) joined the professional tour in 2000 and reached a career-high ranking of no. 46 in singles and no. 22 in doubles. Parra Santonja won 11 WTA doubles titles, as well as 11 singles titles on the ITF Women's Circuit. 
 Lucie Šafářová (born 4 February 1987 in Brno, Czechoslovakia (present-day Czech Republic)) joined the professional tour in 2002 and reached a career-high ranking of no. 5 in singles and no. 1 in doubles. She won seven singles titles and fifteen doubles titles on the WTA Tour, as well as seven singles titles on the ITF Women's Circuit. She reached one Grand Slam singles final at the French Open in 2015, and claimed 5 Grand Slam doubles titles alongside Bethanie Mattek-Sands. Šafářová originally announced that the 2019 Australian Open would be her final tournament, but it would be delayed for further recovery on wrist tendinitis. She played her final competitive match alongside Dominika Cibulková in the first round of the women's doubles at the French Open.
 Barbora Štefková (born 4 April 1995 in Olomouc, Czech Republic)

Comebacks
Following are notable players who will come back after retirements during the 2019 WTA Tour season:
 Tatiana Golovin (born 25 January 1988 in Moscow, Russia) joined the professional tour in 2002 and reached a career-high ranking of no. 12 in singles and no. 91 in doubles. Golovin won two WTA singles titles and the 2004 French Open mixed doubles with compatriot Richard Gasquet. She also made quarterfinal of 2006 US Open in singles. Suffering from ankylosing spondylitis in 2008 season, she decided to walk away from the sport. Her last played tournament was the German Open in May 2008. She announced her comeback in September, 2019 and her first tournament back was Luxembourg Open in October after receiving a wildcard to compete in the qualifying draw.
 Patricia Maria Țig (born 27 July 1994 in Caransebeș, Romania) joined the professional tour in 2009 and reached a career-high ranking of no. 83 in singles and no. 155 in doubles. Țig reached 1 WTA singles final and 2 doubles finals during her career, losing all 3 of them. She also made first round appearances in all four majors. After a period of struggling with her performances in the second half of 2017 season, she decided to focus on her health, citing back pain as the main source of discomfort. Her last played tournament was the (Guangzhou Open) in September 2017. Țig became an inactive player on 24 September 2018 after not playing for 52 consecutive weeks. She announced her comeback to the tour after giving birth to a baby girl. Her first event was an W15 ITF Tournament in Cancún, Mexico, in April.

See also 

2019 ATP Tour
2019 WTA 125K series
2019 ITF Women's Circuit

References

External links 
Women's Tennis Association (WTA) official website
International Tennis Federation (ITF) official website

 
WTA Tour seasons
Wta Tour